Miguel Alberto Mellado (born 18 March 1993) is an Argentine professional footballer who plays as a defensive midfielder for Greek Super League club OFI.

Career

Chacarita Juniors
Mellado started his career with Chacarita Juniors. He made his debut in Primera B Metropolitana on 1 September 2012 in a 1–3 win away to Tristán Suárez. On 27 October, he scored his first professional goal at home to Brown. In total, Mellado played twenty-six times during 2012–13. From January 2014, across the next six seasons, Mellado scored two goals in one hundred and twenty appearances as the club rose from the third tier to the Argentine Primera División.

Deportivo Merlo loan
Mellado was loaned out for the first part of 2013–14 to fellow Primera B Metropolitana club Deportivo Merlo, he went onto play seventeen times for Merlo before returning to Chacarita.

OFI loan
In July 2018, Mellado joined newly-promoted Super League Greece side OFI on loan for one year. On 14 June 2019, OFI announced that Mellado's loan had been extended by an additional year. The Greek club also held a buy-out clause for the summer of 2020, for a reported sum of around €200,000. In two years with OFI, Mellado made forty-eight appearances and scored one goal; versus Aris on 24 August 2019, in a season that ended with UEFA Europa League qualification - twelve months after the club narrowly avoided relegation via the play-offs.

OFI
In August 2020, OFI completed the permanent signing of Mellado. He made his continental competition debut on 17 September, featuring for the full duration of the club's loss to Apollon Limassol in the Europa League second qualifying round. He scored his first goal of 2020–21 on 18 October versus Panathinaikos.

Career statistics
.

References

External links

1993 births
Living people
People from Río Negro Province
Argentine footballers
Association football midfielders
Argentine expatriate footballers
Expatriate footballers in Greece
Argentine expatriate sportspeople in Greece
Primera B Metropolitana players
Primera Nacional players
Argentine Primera División players
Super League Greece players
Chacarita Juniors footballers
Deportivo Merlo footballers
OFI Crete F.C. players